Hendra Ridwan (born in Makassar, Indonesia, 1 December 1985) is an Indonesian professional footballer who plays as a defender or defensive midfielder for Liga 3 club Alesha.

Honours

Club
Persipura Jayapura
 Indonesian Community Shield: 2009
Mitra Kukar
 General Sudirman Cup: 2015

References

External links
 Hendra Ridwan at Soccerway
 Hendra Ridwan at Liga Indonesia

Indonesian footballers
Living people
Indonesian Muslims
Bugis people
1985 births
People from Makassar
Sportspeople from Makassar
Sportspeople from South Sulawesi
Footballers at the 2006 Asian Games
Association football defenders
Asian Games competitors for Indonesia
Persim Maros players
PKT Bontang players
Persmin Minahasa players
Arema F.C. players
Persipura Jayapura players
PSM Makassar players
Persib Bandung players
Mitra Kukar players
Borneo F.C. players
Persiba Balikpapan players
Sriwijaya F.C. players
RANS Nusantara F.C. players
Liga 1 (Indonesia) players
Liga 2 (Indonesia) players
Indonesian Premier Division players
Indonesia youth international footballers
20th-century Indonesian people
21st-century Indonesian people